The Pacific Asia Travel Association (PATA) is a membership association working to promote the responsible development of travel and tourism in the Asia Pacific region.

History
As William J. Mullahey of Pan American Airways set about organizing the first Pacific area travel conference with the aim of promoting tourism to the largely undiscovered region of Asia Pacific.

The purpose of the meeting, Lorrin P. Thurstin noted, was to “discuss cooperation among Pacific countries that would result in a greater exchange of visitors to their mutual advantage, and to develop methods of presenting the Pacific area to the world’s travelers and the travel trade by reducing restrictions on Pacific travel, filling in accommodation gaps, and presenting the Pacific story in advertising and publicity”.

In March 1951, invitations were sent out for the conference, which was to be held in the first week of June, from the office of Hawaii's territorial governor, Ingram Stainback. Unfortunately many of the replies came in too late and the conference was postponed.

It was then in October 1951 that Thurstin, who was in Paris attending a European travel conference, issued his now-famous cable to Mullahey: "Proceed to send invitations to governments and carriers to attend Pacific Area Travel conference for purpose of establishing permanent Pacific Travel Association and determine most convenient date for majority during first three months 1952."

The inaugural conference eventually took place from January 10–15, 1952 at the Maluhia Auditorium of Fort DeRussy in Waikiki, Hawaii. There were 91 delegates in attendance at the conference, including representatives of government and business. Aside from Thurston and Mullahey, those taking a key role at this event were: Robert Allen, chairman of registration and housing; Melvin A. Conant, chairman of conference organisation; Harry Dove, chairman of counselor liaison; John Pugh, co-chairman of entertainment; John Jay Murphy, co-chairman of program and protocol; William O. Cogswell, Sam N. Mercer and Steward E. Fern of the Hawaii Visitors Bureau, and Milton O. Holst of Holst & Cummings, Lrd.

On Tuesday, January 15, 1952, Lorrin Thurston announced that 25 active and 12 allied members had signed the constitution and bylaws of what was now known as the Pacific Interim Travel Association (PITA). PITA was legally incorporated in the state of Hawaii two months later.

The new association's constitution declared its purpose was “To encourage and assist in the development of the travel industries throughout the Pacific area”. While marketing activities were its primary goal, the delegates of the first conference also envisioned the association as one that could work with both government and private business in developing travel.

One of PATA's main accomplishments in its first year was to publicise itself to the international travel community. The association's first executive director Sam Mercer noted that the first conference “focused the attention of the entire travel world on an awakening of tourism in the Pacific”. News articles and press releases were sent to, and subsequently published in, numerous publications – including both specialist travel press and general audience newspapers. A particularly effective vehicle for PITA's self-promotion was its quarterly newspaper, PITA News Bulletin, which by the end of its first year was being sent to over 500 addresses throughout the world.

In its first year, PITA also worked with governments to ease entry and exit requirements for foreigners, seeing success in Japan, the US and the Philippines.

By the second conference in March 1953 (held in Hawaii like the first) PITA had increased its membership from 33 active and allied members to 49. It was also at this conference that it was decided to change the association's name to the ‘Pacific Area Travel Association’ – or PATA.

1950s
In 1953 PATA's headquarters were moved from Hawaii to San Francisco, with Sam Mercer serving as the first executive director. Considered as the state of “money and influence”, San Francisco was home to an influential group of individuals who served on the PATA board and committees during the 1950s and 1960s.

Throughout the first decade, PATA membership grew steadily, attracting a wide range of members including governments, carriers, hotel members, travel agents, cruise lines and the media. Other members eventually included tour operators, educational institutions, vehicle operators, restaurants and catering services, advertising agencies, public relations firms, publications, banks and architectural and research firms.

By the end of the 1950s, PATA had 325 members, while there had also been a steady rise in the annual conference attendance. In 1955, a Research and Survey Committee was established and PATA delegates gave their approval to spend US$8,000 on the organisation's first advertising programme. In 1957 the first issue of Pacific Travel News (PTN) was published, providing PATA with a news vehicle to promote itself and its destinations.

1960s
In 1958, PATA's Board of Directors requested that the US International Cooperation Administration provide US$150,000 for a comprehensive study of the Pacific countries. The results of the survey, which became known as the 'Checchi Report', were presented at the 1962 Annual Conference. It presented to PATA members and NTOs the status of tourism in the Pacific region, both area-wide and individually by country. It contained information regarding the anticipated impact of tourist expenditure, the effects of tourism on jobs and wages, methods of financing tourism development and projections for US visitor arrivals to the Pacific region. The report quickly became a blueprint for many NTO and travel planners, as it methodically presented the economic benefits – both direct and indirect – derived from tourism.

1961 saw the establishment of the first PATA Chapters in New Zealand and Hong Kong. The development of the chapter system was an effort to involve professionals in the travel and tourism industry who could not participate in PATA's activities or attend annual conference and workshops, and to expand PATA's presence in previously untapped markets.

The 1960s also witnessed PATA's first move towards promoting education and training, helping to set up the School of TIM (Tourism Industry Management) at the University of Hawaii – the first such institution to be established in the region.

1970s
At the 23rd Annual Conference, held in Jakarta in 1974, it was decided that there should be a change of emphasis in PATA's function to enable more support for the developmental aspects of tourism within the Pacific area, particularly in industry, education and training. Members stipulated that a new, permanent body be formed, with the name 'Development Authority'. This advisory body would be composed of experts from diverse backgrounds and specialisations, whose purpose would be to carry out the association's intentions towards heritage conservation, education and training, and environmental enhancement.

At its second meeting in August 1974, the newly formed Development Authority accepted its first assignment. It followed a request from Lieutenant General Chalermchai Charuvastr, Director General of the Tourist Organisation of Thailand (TOT), to PATA executive director Marvin Plake to help increase tourism in Thailand. The TOT Director General proposed Chiang Mai as an ideal location for the development of tourism and so PATA sent a travel trade mission – or 'task force' as they later became known – to the northern city. The task force completed its mission in February 1975. Its report "Chiang Mai: A Program or Expanding the Airport" contained a two-stage list of recommendations and addressed the areas of sight-seeing attractions, marketing, air service, air cargo, airport development, community relations and statistical record-keeping.

The years following the task force saw visitor arrivals to Chiang Mai increase, however there was still a relatively poor showing in foreign arrivals. PATA dispatched a second task force team to the city in 1977 where, amongst other issues, they considered the economics of international air service there. Their report "Chiang Mai, The Introduction of International Air Service", contained both short and long-term recommendations which were submitted to TOT. The Thai government later implemented a development plan for Chiang Mai largely based on PATA's blueprint.

The 1970s also saw the first ever PATA Travel Mart in Manila (1978). The highly successful and popular event was the brainchild of then-PATA Staff Vice President Gerald Picolla, who saw the potential of such marts to generate huge volumes of business for participating member organisations at a fraction of the cost of doing business on the road.

1980s

In 1984 the PATA Board of Directors approved the creation of the PATA Foundation, creating a new role for the association as a benefactor of culture and heritage policy by administering project funding. Under the leadership of its first chair, George Howling, the foundation began securing funds for education, research and heritage conservation. The foundation sought assistance from PATA Chapters in carrying out is work, including the production of professional papers on handicraft preservation, area-wide inventories of heritage assets, and conservation programs for endangered wildlife. At first larger projects were targeted, but the focus then turned to small projects as it enabled the foundation to distribute its assistance more efficiently and effectively. For example, in 1988, the foundation funded the inventory and architectural record-keeping of historic buildings for a historic district preservation project in Pokhara, Nepal.

1986 saw PATA change its name from Pacific Area Travel Association to Pacific Asia Travel Association to reflect the ever-increasing importance of Asia in commerce and world affairs.

The first World Chapters Congress in 1989 attracted 250 delegates from 58 chapters with ‘Teamwork Toward Success’ as the theme.

1990s
With tourism to PATA member countries booming, concerns began to grow about environmental, cultural and heritage preservation. At the 1991 Annual Conference in Bali, PATA's 40th, there was a call from over 1,500 delegates from more than 50 countries to promote ecologically responsible travel and tourism under the conference theme 'Enrich the Environment'. This occasion marked the beginning of PATA's role as an 'authoritative' voice for sustainable tourism in the Pacific Asia region and in January 1992, the PATA Board of Directors approved the PATA 'Code for Environmentally Responsible Tourism' and it was officially adopted at the Annual Conference in Hong Kong later that same year.

1992: PATA publication: Endemic Tourism: A profitable industry in a sustainable environment. ‘The tourism industry must be profitable and environmentally sustainable if it is to provide long-term benefits, but this will not be achieved without a new and different approach to industry planning and development.’

1992: After intense discussions and negotiations, the China National Tourism Administration (CNTA) joined PATA as a government member

1993: PATA/WTO Human Resources for Tourism Conference : 4–6 October 1993, Bali, Indonesia

1994: Lahore, Pakistan: PATA Adventure Travel and Ecotourism Conference. 
Photo from Lahore, 1994

Further environmental efforts came in 1994, when PATA's Green Leaf program was launched,  with the aim of encouraging members to incorporate CERT (Code for Environmentally Responsible Tourism) into their operations. It became a centerpiece of PATA's initiatives in the area of sustainable tourism, but was later integrated into the WTTC-run Green Globe programme in 2000.

1996: Pokara, Nepal: PATA Adventure Travel and Ecotourism Conference.

Following the Gulf War, PATA created the Accelerated Marketing Program (AMP), designed to support member destinations affected by conflict.

The end of the decade – 1998 – saw PATA relocated its head office from San Francisco to Bangkok to be in the heart of its membership region.

2000s

2000: PATA Task Force North Sulawesi: Noakes, Steve. (et al) (2000) Charting a new Direction for Sustainable Tourism in North Sulawesi, Indonesia.

17 April 2001: Kuala Lumpur– The new Pacific Asia Travel Association (PATA) chairman, John Sanford, has pledged to stay committed to sustainable tourism. Sanford laid out his agenda for his one-year term.

The PATA Traveller's Code was approved by the PATA Sustainable Tourism Committee at its April 13, 2002 meeting in New Delhi, India.

2002: PATA Task Force to Western Java & Eastern Sumatra, Indonesia. Noakes, Steve. (et al.) (2002) Values – Benefits – Impacts: Planning for Sustainable Tourism in the provinces of Indonesia in a time of de-centralisation of the national Government. PATA Task Force report on Banten and Lampung Provinces, Republic of Indonesia.

In 2003 PATA launches Project Phoenix, a global consumer communications campaign to re-invigorate travel and tourism in Pacific Asia. It came in response to the battering the travel industry and economies in the region had taken due to the September 11, 2001 terrorist attacks in the US, the wars in Afghanistan and Iraq, the Bali bombs and SARS. This year also saw PATA adopt the ‘Allied Partner’ concept, inviting local, regional and national tourist bodies outside PATA's geographic region to gain access to Asia Pacific's outbound markets.

2004 saw PATA change its Mission Statement to include tourism ‘to, from and within’ Asia Pacific, thereby recognizing the importance of the region as a growing outbound market.

Following the December 2004 Indian Ocean tsunami, PATA launches a relief fund.

Driven by the leadership of the Sustainable Tourism Committee, the 2006 PATA AGM accepted a new Mission Statement for PATA, which for the first time, embodies the concepts of 'responsible development' and 'sustainable growth' of tourism in the region. It now reads:
'The Pacific Asia Travel Association (PATA) is a membership association acting as a catalyst for the responsible development of the Asia Pacific travel and tourism industry. In partnership with PATA's private and public sector members, we enhance the sustainable growth, value and quality of travel and tourism to, from and within the region’.

With the support of CNTA, the PATA Beijing Office is set up in 2007 – the first travel related international organisation officially registered in China.

In 2008 PATA provides crisis communication training to Chengdu's tourism industry just one month after the Sichuan earthquake, while the PATA Foundation grants a post-crisis Fund for Sichuan.

In 2010 PATA launched the Travel Intelligence Graphic Architecture (TIGA) initiative to enable better decision making by tourism professionals.

On 17 September 2010, it was announced that current CEO Greg Duffell would leave PATA by February 2011 after just 18 months in the role 

In July 2012, PATA re-established its Hong Kong Chapter.

Present
In 2011 PATA celebrate its 60th anniversary with a series of activities and events focused around the theme 'Building Tourism. Past.Present.Progressive'.
On September 6–9, PATA Travel Mart 2011  held at Pragati Maidan, New Delhi, India.

In 2012, at the Annual General Meeting in Kuala Lumpur, Malaysia, PATA launched PATAmPOWER, which was an enhancement of the Travel Intelligence Graphic Architecture (TIGA) initiative redeveloped in HTML5, to enable use by mobile devices. The objective of PATAmPOWER is to be your one stop for data about the Asia Pacific visitor economy, improving productivity, providing faster insights and enabling smarter decisions.

In 2013, PATA appoints a Corporate Social Responsibility specialist who facilitates signing of MOU with the Global Sustainable Tourism Council (GSTC), the international body fostering increased knowledge and understanding of sustainable tourism practices by destinations and tourism enterprises.

In 2013 PATA helped to align industry advocacy with other travel and tourism industry bodies, formally launching the Global Travel Association Coalition (GTAC). PATA is a founding member of this global group which also includes Airports Council International (ACI), Cruise Line International Association (CLIA), International Air Transport Association (IATA), International Civil Aviation Organisation (ICAO), World Economic Forum (WEF), World Tourism Organization (UNWTO) and the World Travel & Tourism Council.

In the same year, PATA also launched an interactive training programme PATAcademy-HCD, incorporating intensive classroom interactions led by leading travel industry practitioners with practical activities, group assignments, networking events and field visits in and around Bangkok.

On November 1, 2014, PATA appointed Mario Hardy as its chief executive officer (CEO), succeeding Martin Craigs. Hardy had previously been Chief Operations Officer (COO) of PATA since January 15, 2014.

On November 7, 2014, PATA and Myriad Marketing launched PATA Conversations, a B2B digital publication focusing upon travel and tourism to, from and within the Asia Pacific region.

In December 2014 PATA launched the monthly Connected Visitor Economy Bulletin, making it free to both members and non-members. The Connected Visitor Economy Bulletin is produced on a monthly basis and covers trends and developments across the Asia Pacific region. It aims to monitor the far-reaching impact of travel and tourism across national economies, in order to encourage better and more comprehensive policy responses from governments in support of the sector.

On February 17, 2015, the Tourism Industry Association New Zealand (TIA) and PATA sign a Memorandum of Understanding (MOU) that focuses on four main areas of co-operation: the sharing of information and insight, support for collective policy and advocacy positions, industry connectivity, and collaboration on mutual events.

On March 4, 2015, PATA launched its new microsite, sustain.pata.org. The site, a new online tool for information on sustainable and socially responsible travel and tourism issues, is supported in part by the German Ministry for Economic Cooperation and Development BMZ, implemented by Deutsche Gesellschaft für Internationale Zusammenarbeit (GIZ) GmbH, and by EarthCheck.

On May 4, 2015, in response to the earthquake that killed and injured thousands of people and devastated much of Kathmandu's tourism infrastructure nine days earlier, the PATA Foundation established a Nepal Earthquake Tourism Recovery Fund to assist the PATA Nepal Chapter in its tourism industry recovery efforts.

On May 27, 2015, PATA, in partnership with TripAdvisor, launched the PATA CEO Challenge to help promote uniqueness and diversity of heritage, culture, customs and natural beauty of the world's many diverse destinations. It aims to promote and enhance the number of visitors to emerging destinations and enhances tourism development in the most sustainable manner.

On June 21, 2015, PATA presented Nepal with the PATA Nepal Tourism Rapid Recovery Task Force Report to help the country recover from the devastating earthquake that killed and injured thousands of people and devastated much of Kathmandu's tourism infrastructure.

On June 10, 2015, PATA announced the inaugural PATA Global Insights Conference 2015, to be hosted in Auckland, New Zealand on October 16, 2015, at the SKYCITY Grand Hotel. The conference explored the key influences that will drive and shape future thinking in terms of tourism destination development, design, access and marketing.

On June 24, 2015, PATA and the International Union for Conservation of Nature (IUCN) created a new partnership, in the form of a memorandum of understanding (MoU), recognising the positive impacts that their collaboration can have in the areas of conservation and sustainable development. The specific objectives of the MoU include collaboration in capacity building, knowledge sharing, and networking, both online and in person. PATA members may now increase their knowledge of wider sustainability issues, particularly in relation to Mangroves for the Future (MFF) and coastal tourism, as well as IUCN case studies showcasing positive examples of sustainable tourism on PATA's sustainability website, sustain.pata.org.

On November 19, 2015, PATA  forged an organisational partnership with the International Gay and Lesbian Travel Association (IGLTA). The agreement strengthens the bond and shared interests between the two associations.
The Memorandum of Understanding (MoU) was signed by PATA CEO Mario Hardy and IGLTA President/CEO John Tanzella at World Travel Market in London, United Kingdom on Thursday November 5, 2015. The agreement commits the two organisations to share knowledge through research and publications, to reciprocate in event participation, to support mutual agreed advocacy positions, and to enhance access for the benefit of members of both organisations

On December 8, 2015, PATA announced an organisational partnership with the Professional Travel Bloggers Association (PTBA) to strengthen the cooperation and shared interests between the two associations.
One of the first activities of the newly signed partnership was to combine efforts to encourage buyers, sellers and conference delegates to connect with leading industry travel bloggers at the PATA Adventure Travel and Responsible Tourism Conference and Mart 2016 in Chiang Rai, Thailand from February 17–19, 2016 at the Dusit Island Resort Chiang Rai.

On April 18, 2016, PATA and the Reef-World Foundation(Reef-World) announced a new organisational partnership that recognises the positive impacts that their mutual support and endorsement can have in the areas of marine conservation and in the sustainable development of marine initiatives and opportunities. The specific objectives of this partnership include the mutual support and endorsement of both organisations as well as collaboration in awareness building and knowledge sharing on related issues.

References

External links

 http://trove.nla.gov.au/work/33241804?q=subject%3A%22Sulawesi+%28Indonesia%29%22&c=book&versionId=41265084

Pacific Ocean
Traveling business organizations
Travel-related organizations